Joseph Christopher Amrhein, Jr. (born July 21, 1990) is a former American football quarterback. He played college football at Cornell. He signed with the Hamilton Tiger-Cats of the Canadian Football League as an undrafted free agent in 2013.

College career

Amrhein served as the team's backup quarterback during the 2011 season, seeing action in one game. He completed his only pass attempt against Yale for three years. A strong-armed quarterback with excellent footwork, Amrhein missed the entire 2010 season due to a shoulder injury. Amrhein showed great potential in suiting up with the varsity as a rookie. He saw action in the home game against Fordham in 2009, completing 1-of-4 passes for six yards and an interception. Amrhein was listed as the backup on the team's two-deep throughout that season.

On October 13, 2012, he started and beat Monmouth University 41–38.  He went 33 of 56, throwing for 523 yards and 1 touchdown. This was the 3rd-highest passing yards in a single game in Ivy League history.

Professional career
On May 29, 2013, he signed with the Hamilton Tiger-Cats of the Canadian Football League as an undrafted free agent. On June 22, he was released.

References

External links
Hamilton Tiger-Cats bio

1990 births
Living people
American football quarterbacks
Players of American football from Massachusetts
People from Hingham, Massachusetts
Sportspeople from Plymouth County, Massachusetts
Cornell Big Red football players
Hamilton Tiger-Cats players
Canadian football quarterbacks
American players of Canadian football